RNA methyltransferase-like protein 1 is an enzyme that in humans is encoded by the RNMTL1 gene.

References

Further reading